Hector Rolando Uribe (born January 17, 1946 in Brownsville, Texas) is an American lawyer, former Democratic member of the Texas Senate, District 27 and a past candidate for Texas Land Commissioner. He is also an actor, listed as Roland Uribe, having been in more than ten movies including the multiple award-winning film, No Country for Old Men.

Education

He graduated from Christopher Columbus Marist High School in Miami, Florida and later attended the University of Madrid in the summer of 1966.

He graduated from the University of Miami with a Bachelor of Arts in 1967 and later a Juris Doctor in 1970.

Texas Senator

He served in the Texas House of Representatives from 1978 to 1981 and in the Texas Senate from 1981 to 1991.

As a senator, he worked to pass the Texas Enterprise Zone Act, which is designed to create new jobs in economically impacted areas, and the Protective Services for the Elderly Act, which guards against abuse of senior citizens. He also worked to establish the University of Texas–Pan American.

Uribe, a narrow winner in the March 2, 2010, Democratic primary for land commissioner, faced the incumbent Republican Jerry E. Patterson in the November 2, 2010 general election but lost with 35 percent of the ballots cast.

Acting

Hector has starred in many films and theatre productions usually showcasing his Mexican heritage and Spanish. Of these films, his most prominent was a minor character in No Country for Old Men.

In 2018, he starred in the independent film Tejano alongside Patrick Mackie which was directed by David Blue Garcia. His role as a dying grandfather earned him a Best Supporting Actor Award from the Queen Palm Int’l Film Festival.

Fort Trevino-Uribe

Hector is related to Blas Maria Uribe who is credited as expanding Fort Trevino-Uribe in San Ygnacio,TX. It is a historic home as well as being one of the oldest buildings from the Spanish-Mexican settlement north of the Rio Grande. The Uribe family has been in the San Ygnacio, TX area for centuries. His family also built the Uribe Chico House as well as other buildings in the town.

In the second half of President Trump’s presidency, a proposed wall would have cut these structures off from the main town and put them outside its borders. Hector was a vocal opponent to such an action as a democrat and as a member of the Uribe family.

References

External links
 Official IMDB Page

1946 births
Hispanic and Latino American state legislators in Texas
Living people
Democratic Party Texas state senators
People from Brownsville, Texas
University of Miami School of Law alumni
Texas lawyers
American politicians of Mexican descent
People from Zapata County, Texas